In the theory of dynamical systems, an isolating neighborhood is a compact set in the phase space of an invertible dynamical system with the property that any orbit contained entirely in the set belongs to its interior. This is a basic notion in the Conley index theory. Its variant for non-invertible systems is used in formulating a precise mathematical definition of an attractor.

Definition

Conley index theory 

Let X be the phase space of an invertible discrete or continuous dynamical system with evolution operator 

 

A compact subset N is called an isolating neighborhood if 

 

where Int N is the interior of N. The set Inv(N,F) consists of all points whose trajectory remains in N for all positive and negative times. A set S is an isolated (or locally maximal) invariant set if S = Inv(N, F) for some isolating neighborhood N.

Milnor's definition of attractor 
Let 

 

be a (non-invertible) discrete dynamical system. A compact invariant set A is called isolated, with (forward) isolating neighborhood N if A is the intersection of forward images of N and moreover, A is contained in the interior of N:

  

It is not assumed that the set N is either invariant or open.

See also 

 Limit set

References 

 Konstantin Mischaikow, Marian Mrozek, Conley index. Chapter 9 in Handbook of Dynamical Systems, vol 2, pp 393–460, Elsevier 2002 
 

Limit sets